Saint George School https://stgeorge.do/
 Brilliant Minds School https://bms.edu.do
Dominica Website 1
New Horizons Bilingual School Website 2
Colegio Bilingue Centro de Estudios Delin www.centrodelin.com 3
Jarabacoa Christian School (http://www.jcs.com.do/education/index.php/en/) 4
 Baby's First School Facebook 5
 St. Mary's School Website 6
The Community for Learning school  7
 Colegio Buena Vista Website 8
 Colegio Senderos website 9
 SOS Santiago Primary School  10
 SOS Los Mina Primary School  11
 Escuela Parroquial Santa Rita 12
 Carol Morgan School 14
 SEK Las Americas 15
 Cemep 16
 Saint Michael’s School 17
 Saint Joseph School 18
 CONSA 19
 International School of Sosua 20
 Notre Dame School of Santo Domingo 21
 Colegio Arrollo Hondo 22
 Colegio Cardenal Sancha 23
 Colegio Ronda Infantil 24
 Colegio San Juan Bautista de la Salle 25
 Colegio Santa Clara 26
Colegio Quisqueya 27
 Colegio Dominicano de  La Salle 28
 Colegio Cristiano Ministerios Be-tel 29
 Americas Bicultural School (ABC) 30
 Colegio Serafin de Asis 31
 Colegio del Apostolado Website 32
 Colegio Baby Care Center Tia Ury 33
 Colegio Mi Colegio 34
 Colegio Loyola de Santo Domingo 35
MI-EL Christian School 36
Colegio San Judas Tadeo 37
Colegio Pre-Universitario Lux Mundi 38
Colegio Babeque Secundaria Website 39
Colegio Bilingue Nuevo Horisons/Grazyna School 40
Saint Thomas School 41
Saint Patrick School 42
Centro Educativo los Prados (CELP) Website 43
Centro Educativo Amador 44
Colegio Santo Domingo 45
The Ashton School 46
Colegio Calasanz 47
King's Christian School 48
Colegio Domínico-Americano 49
American School of Santo Domingo 50
Instituto Montessori 51
Colegio San Rafael 52
The Cathedral School of Santo Domingo Website 53
Centro De Formacion Don Mattt 54
La Vega Christian School (www.lavegachristianschool.com) 55
Colegio Peces Centro Montessori 56
Colegio Cristiano Genesis 57
 Doulos Discovery School Facebook 58
American Christian School (Dominican Republic) 59
Instituto Técnico Salesiano (ITESA) 60
O&M Hostos School of (Puerto Plata) Website 61
Colegio Taller Victoria Montás (CTVM) 62
St.Martin primary school (big section)
St.Martin primary school (small section)
S.M.P school

The Do

 American School of Santo Domingo
 Lycée Français de Saint Domingue (French school)
 Colegio Cristiano Adonai

Schools
Dominican Republic
Schools
Dominican Republic
Schools